George Green (13 April 1880 – 25 November 1940) was an English first-class cricketer who played for Derbyshire between 1903 and 1907.

Green was born at Hasland, Derbyshire, the son of William Green a general labourer and his wife Mary Ann. He made his debut for Derbyshire in the 1903 season against London County in August, when he scored a  duck in his only innings and bowled four overs without a wicket. He played two matches in the 1904 season  when he bowled 2 for 40 against Nottinghamshire and made his top score of 20 against Surrey. In the 1906 season he played one game against Marylebone Cricket Club (MCC), when he took 2 for 31. He played two final matches in the 1907 season in which he made low scores and took no wickets.

Green played eleven innings in six first-class matches with an average of 3.54 and a top score of 20. He was a left-arm medium pace bowler and took 6 first-class wickets at an average of 39.33 and a best performance of 2 for 31.

Green died at Clay Cross, Derbyshire at the age of 60,

References

1880 births
1940 deaths
Derbyshire cricketers
English cricketers
People from Hasland
Cricketers from Derbyshire